The least horseshoe bat (Rhinolophus pusillus) is a species of bat in the family Rhinolophidae. It is found in Cambodia, China, India, Indonesia, Laos, Malaysia, Myanmar, Nepal, Thailand and Vietnam. It is a food source of the parasite Sinospelaeobdella, a jawed land leech.

See also
 
 
 List of mammals in Hong Kong

References

Rhinolophidae
Bats of Asia
Bats of Southeast Asia
Bats of Indonesia
Bats of Malaysia
Mammals of Myanmar
Mammals of Cambodia
Bats of China
Fauna of Hong Kong
Mammals of India
Mammals of Japan
Mammals of Laos
Mammals of Nepal
Mammals of the Philippines
Mammals of Singapore
Mammals of Taiwan
Mammals of Thailand
Mammals of Vietnam
Mammals described in 1834
Taxonomy articles created by Polbot
Taxa named by Coenraad Jacob Temminck

Bats of India